Mishiguaganan (possibly from Ancash Quechua mishi cat, Quechua waqay crying, to cry, -na a suffix, "where the cat cries", -n a suffix) is a mountain in the Huaguruncho mountain range in the Andes of Peru, about  high. It is located in the Pasco Region, Pasco Province, Ticlacayán District, southwest of Huaguruncho.

References

Mountains of Peru
Mountains of Pasco Region